Turbo Delphi is a discontinued integrated development environment (IDE), created by CodeGear, which was targeted towards student, amateur, individual professionals, and hobbyist programmers.  It used the Delphi programming language, which is a dialect of Object Pascal.

History

Turbo Delphi (for .NET) 2006 Explorer
On August 8, 2006, Developer Tools Group of Borland Software Corporation announced plans to release single language versions of Borland Developer Studio, which includes Turbo Delphi for Win32, Turbo Delphi for .NET, Turbo C++, Turbo C#. The Turbo Explorer versions are free downloadable version, and Turbo Professional versions are priced less than $500. On September 5, 2006, Developer Tools Group of Borland Software Corporation announced the initial releases of the Turbo products.

There were two versions of Turbo Delphi, one which generates native Win32 applications (Turbo Delphi for Windows), and one that generated bytecode for the Microsoft .NET CLR. Each version came in two editions, a free Explorer edition and a Professional edition. The Professional edition was a commercial product available for purchase from Borland/Embarcadero, and it allowed extension and customization of the IDE that was not available in the Explorer edition.

Minimum supported operating system was changed to Windows 2000. Compiler used was based on 2006 compiler, supporting .NET framework 1.1. Database support was limited to InterBase 7.5 and MySQL 4.0.

It was most recently distributed by the CodeGear division of Embarcadero Technologies, which was purchased from Borland in 2008.

In October 2009, Embarcadero discontinued support of Turbo Delphi, along with the other Turbo products including Turbo C++ Builder. The product is no longer available for download, and it is not possible to receive a registration key from Embarcadero, which was required to use the product. The latest release of Turbo Delphi was 2006, and it was based upon Embarcadero's product Delphi 2006.

Following the discontinuation of Turbo products, the offer was replaced by free trial version of Embracadero Delphi XE Starter edition.

See also
Borland Delphi
Kylix
Lazarus
Turbo C#

References

External links
Borland Software Corporation pages: Turbo Delphi, Turbo Delphi for .NET

CodeGear software